Sherelle Emma Jacobs is a British journalist. She is the Assistant Comment Editor at The Daily Telegraph and has previously written for The Guardian.

Career 
Jacobs started her career working on the breaking news desk for Deutsche Welle in the German city of Bonn. Jacobs subsequently worked in Tunisia as a freelance journalist.  While in Tunis, her journalistic interest was focused on the Arab Spring, its problems and the rise of Islamist extremism in the Maghreb.

She appeared on the panel of the BBC's Question Time in November 2019 and on Any Questions? in May of the same year. Jacobs is a Brexit supporter and has been lauded by The Conservative Woman website as a rising star. Jacobs is sceptical towards elements within the environmental movements claims of a climate emergency, while still believing climate change is an existential problem.

In February 2019, Jacobs was criticised by Owen Jones for using the term "Cultural Marxism" in an editorial for the Daily Telegraph.

Personal life 
Jacobs attended St Paul's Girls' School and read history at the School of Oriental and African Studies in London.

Notes

External links
Sherelle Jacobs on Muckrack.com

21st-century British journalists
The Daily Telegraph people
Alumni of SOAS University of London
Living people
People educated at St Paul's Girls' School
Year of birth missing (living people)